Shantanu Sengupta is an Indian cell biologist and a professor at the Institute of Genomics and Integrative Biology (IGIB) of the Council of Scientific and Industrial Research. At IGIB, he coordinates the activities of the National Facility for Biochemical and Genomic Resources (NFBGR) and the Proteomics and Structural Biology Unit of the institute. He is a member of the executive council of the Proteomic Society, India and is known for his studies of cardiovascular diseases from a genetic perspective as well as of Homocysteine with regard to its toxicity and its role in epigenetic modifications. His studies have been documented by way of a number of articles and ResearchGate, an online repository of scientific articles has listed 149 of them. The Department of Biotechnology of the Government of India awarded him the National Bioscience Award for Career Development, one of the highest Indian science awards, for his contributions to biosciences, in 2011.

Selected bibliography

See also 

 Mendelian randomization
 Hyperhomocysteinemia

Notes

References

External links 
 

N-BIOS Prize recipients
Indian scientific authors
Living people
Indian medical academics
Indian medical researchers
Scientists from Delhi
Indian cell biologists
Year of birth missing (living people)